Dictyonema subobscuratum is a species of basidiolichen in the family Hygrophoraceae. It is endemic to the Galápagos Islands, where it mostly grows as an epiphyte over bryophytes on branches and trunks in humid zones. It was formally described as a new species in 2017 by Manuela Dal-Forno, Frank Bungartz, and Robert Lücking. The specific epithet subobscuratum refers to its similarity with Dictyonema obscuratum, found in Brazil.

References

subobscuratum
Lichen species
Lichens described in 2017
Lichens of the Galápagos Islands
Taxa named by Robert Lücking
Basidiolichens